Captain J. Flint is a fictional golden age pirate captain who features in a number of novels, television series, and films. The original character was created by the Scottish writer Robert Louis Stevenson (1850–1894). Flint first appears in the classic adventure yarn Treasure Island, which was first serialised in a children's magazine in 1881, and later published as a novel in 1883.

In Treasure Island

Captain Flint is a fictional character in the book Treasure Island, created by Robert Louis Stevenson in 1883. In Stevenson's book, Flint, whose first name is not given, was the captain of a pirate ship, The Walrus, which accumulated an enormous amount of captured treasure, approximately £700,000. On August 1, 1750, Flint and six members of his crew bury the plunder on an island located somewhere in the Caribbean Sea. Flint then murders his six assistants, leaving the corpse of one, Allardyce, with its arms outstretched in the direction of the buried treasure.

The only person Flint was said to fear was his quartermaster John Silver, who later even called his parrot "Captain Flint" in mockery.

Flint is said to have died in Savannah, many years before the book's central plot takes place, with his last words being, "Darby M'Graw - fetch aft the rum...." His death was said in the book to have been caused by the effects of drinking too much rum. The inscription on the map suggests that he died on July 28, 1754. The location of the treasure had been marked by Flint on a map and while he was dying it entrusted to his first mate William "Billy" Bones. With the exception of Long John Silver many of Flint's crew spend all their ill-gotten booty and end up begging (e.g. Blind Pew). Bones however is too much of a drunken bully of a miser to either find the rest of the treasure or give up the map for his former crewmates and becomes a marked man on the run for 3 years after Flint's death by Flints old crew (Blind Pew; Black Dog; Job Anderson; Israel Hands; Dirk), of whom the ringleader is Long John Silver. They track Bones down (who like Flint dies of drinking too much rum); however before they can get the map it falls into the hands of the protagonist of the novel, Jim Hawkins.

Other novels
Flint has a major part in the 1924 prequel Porto Bello Gold, by A. D. Howden Smith, which depicts the way that the treasure was captured from a Spanish galleon. In this version, Flint is described as having started his piratical career as the junior partner of Andrew Murray, an idealistic Jacobite turned pirate, who is not referenced in Stevenson's original book. Flint gradually becomes the dominant partner. The book describes how Flint secretly buries the treasure which would be recovered a generation later by the protagonists of Treasure Island.

John Drake's prequels: Flint and Silver (2008), Pieces of Eight (2009), and Skull and Bones (2010), all heavily feature Captain Flint and give his Christian name as Joseph.

Flint is mentioned in the novel Peter and Wendy by J. M. Barrie, a friend of Stevenson.  The first mention is in a passage introducing Captain Hook's pirate crew: "Here is Bill Jukes, every inch of him tattooed, the same Bill Jukes who got six dozen on the WALRUS from Flint before he would drop the bag of moidores."  The second mention is as Hook is attempting to intimidate the Darling children and the Lost Boys, but is heckled by his inner demons: "'I am the only man whom Barbecue feared,' he urged, 'and Flint feared Barbecue.'  'Barbecue, Flint—what house?' came the cutting retort."

In Arthur Ransome's book Swallows and Amazons, the Blacketts' uncle James Turner is nicknamed Captain Flint by the Walkers. This is because they believed that he looked like a retired pirate and took the name from Treasure Island. He is nearly always referred to by this name in the rest of the books.

Appearances in film
Flint appears briefly in the Soviet comedy adaptation Return to Treasure Island in some live-action scenes, although not in the "main story" hand-drawn part. At the very beginning of the film, he is seen digging his treasure and completing his map. At the same scene, some pirates try to kill Flint to get that map, but instead they kill each other in a cartoon-ish way, unable to peacefully decide who is the best one to have it; however, then Billy Bones makes his step from behind of the tree and kills Flint with his gun, taking that map from his body. Nevertheless, a character meant to be Flint or resembling him (possibly, his ghost) still appears in most of the live-action scenes, ending with the final scene, in which he complains that the movie is over, so he "won't be probably killed". He was played by Valery Chiglyayev (throughout the movie) and Yuri Nevgamonny (second part of the movie, Ben Gunn story).

In the movie Muppet Treasure Island, a loose adaptation of the Stevenson story, Captain Flint is shown at the opening burying the said treasure and thereafter killing all the crew who buried it for him. He then returns to sea and gives his map of the place to Billy Bones, who takes it with him. Flint has fifteen crew members to dig the treasure pit in this version, not six, so there is a difference. Also, the treasure itself is guineas and pieces of eight. In the film, he is known as Bernie Flint, as Benjamina Gunn mentions.

Captain Flint was shown briefly in the animated feature film Treasure Planet by Disney. In this film, the character was voiced by Peter Cullen, and known as Nathaniel Flint, a space pirate of non-human origins whose reputation was legendary for leading his ship and his crew to plunder merchant ships, infamously appearing and disappearing without a trace, and eventually burying his treasure (called by many "Flint's Trove" and/or "the loot of a thousand worlds") inside the giant alien mechanism known as Treasure Planet. To make sure nobody would steal his treasure, he rigged the planet to explode should anyone set off the booby trap and stole the memory of B.E.N so he would not let him tell anyone by the trap Flint set on the planet.

Appearances on television 

Set roughly two decades before the events of Treasure Island, the 2014 televised series Black Sails follows the adventures of Captain Flint and his pirate crew.  His first name is given as James in the episode "VI."  Episodes "IX" and "XIII" further reveal that he is a disgraced former Royal Navy lieutenant named James McGraw, dismissed from the service for falling in love and having an affair with Lord Thomas Hamilton. He was exiled from England with Thomas' wife, Miranda Barlow, who has subsequently since hidden herself as a lowly Puritan lady on the trading island of New Providence. Lord Thomas Hamilton was the son of Lord Alfred Hamilton, lord proprietor of the Bahama Islands. McGraw adopted the name "Flint" after a mysterious man who boarded his grandfather's ship while at anchor and then disappeared. He is portrayed by Toby Stephens.

References

External links
Analysis of the novel Treasure Island

Treasure Island characters
Fictional pirates
Fictional sea captains
Literary characters introduced in 1883
Fictional English people
Male characters in film
Male characters in literature
Male characters in television
Fictional people from the 18th-century
Fictional LGBT characters in television